The Magic Theatre is a theatre company founded in 1967, presently based at the historic Fort Mason Center on  San Francisco's northern waterfront.  The Magic Theatre is well known and respected for its singular focus on the development and production of new plays. Sean San José is the Artistic Director.

History
The Magic Theatre  originated in 1967 when John Lion, a student of Jan Kott at the University of California, directed a production of Eugène Ionesco's The Lesson at the Steppenwolf Bar in Berkeley. The theatre's name came from a crucial location in Hermann Hesse's 1927 novel Steppenwolf: "Anarchist Evening at the Magic Theatre, For Madmen Only, Price of Admission Your Mind".

The Magic's first real success came with plays written by renowned Beat poet Michael McClure, who sustained an eleven-year residency. The theatre reached a turning point when company members wanted to restructure it as a collective. Lion responded by moving the theatre across the bay to San Francisco, where it resided in a series of low-rent venues including another bar, the Rose and Thistle. In 1976 Lion learned of plans to convert a historic military base into an arts center with a view of Alcatraz and the Golden Gate Bridge . The idea was to change "swords into plowshares". The Magic became one of Fort Mason's first resident non-profit companies.

Sam Shepard began his long association with the Magic as playwright in residence in 1975. The Magic produced the world premiere productions of his Inacoma (1977), Buried Child (1978), Suicide in B-flat, True West (1980) directed by Robert Woodruff, Fool for Love (1983), and The Late Henry Moss (2000). Buried Child was awarded the 1979 Pulitzer Prize for Drama. Shepard also developed collaborative pieces with the renowned actor and director Joseph Chaikin. Other playwrights associated with the theatre include John O'Keefe, who staged many of his plays there, including Shimmer.

In 1986, John Lion and the Magic received the Margo Jones Award, the highest honor given by the Dramatists Guild. The award cited the Magic's "significant contribution to the dramatic art through the production of new plays." John Lion left the Magic in the late 1980s to teach, direct and lecture. He died suddenly on August 1, 1999.

Larry Eilenberg became the Artistic Director in 1992, and was followed by Mame Hunt until 1998. Eilenberg resumed the position for five more seasons, during which time he premiered Charles L. Mee's Summertime and First Love and Moira Buffini's Silence. His Festival of Irish Women Playwrights resulted in the Magic's offering the U.S. premiere of Marie Jones' Stones in His Pockets, before its Broadway run.

Recent history
Loretta Greco was artistic director from 2008 to 2020. Prior to joining Magic, she was the producing artistic director of the Women's Project in New York City.  In her first season she used a viral fundraising campaign to recover from a financial crisis and keep the season going. 

In the fall of 2010, the Magic Theatre collaborated with the Marin Theatre Company and the American Conservatory Theater to put on "The Brother/Sister Plays," a set of plays by Tarell Alvin McCraney. The Magic performed "The Brothers Size", which was directed by Octavio Solis and starred Tobie Windham, Joshua Elijah Reese, and Alex Ubokudom, with a set design by James Faerron. Among the other plays at the Magic in 2010 two were listed in the San Francisco Chronicle's Top Ten: Luis Alfaro's Oedipus el Rey and Liz Duffy Adams' Or.

In 2021 Sean San José took over as Artistic Director.

Actors
Actors who have performed at the Magic include Danny Glover, Peter Coyote, Kathy Baker, Ed Harris, John O'Keefe (also playwright), and the original cast of The Late Henry Moss, Nick Nolte, Sean Penn, Woody Harrelson, James Gammon and Cheech Marin.

References

External links 
 Magic Theatre homepage
 Guide to the Magic Theatre Records and Guide to the Magic Theatre Scripts, 1966-1990 at The Bancroft Library
 Michael McClure Home Page
 Web page devoted to Sam Shepard

Theatre companies in San Francisco
Theatres in San Francisco
Performing groups established in 1967
1967 establishments in California